Megachile steinbachi is a species of bee in the family Megachilidae. It was described by Friese in 1906.

References

Steinbachi
Insects described in 1906